Haim Hillel Ben-Sasson ( (1914 in Valozhyn – 16 May 1977 in Jerusalem) was professor of Jewish medieval history at Hebrew University of Jerusalem and the editor of History of the Jewish People.

Books
 A History of the Jewish People, Harvard University Press, 1976,

References

1914 births
1977 deaths
20th-century Spanish historians
Academic staff of the Hebrew University of Jerusalem
Burials at the Jewish cemetery on the Mount of Olives
Israeli medievalists